Dan Charles (born September 24, 1985) is an American professional mixed martial artist competing in the heavyweight division. A professional competitor since 2011, he has competed for Bellator MMA and Absolute Championship Berkut.

Background
Born and raised in Phoenix, Arizona, Charles was a three-sport athlete in high school with wrestling, football, and baseball, excelling at all three. Charles briefly continued his football career in college at Scottsdale Community College, before being introduced to MMA by his brother.

Mixed martial arts career

Early career
Charles had just one amateur bout; a 15 second knockout loss, but elected to make his professional MMA debut later two months later in July 2011. Charles began his professional career 7-0 before being signed by Bellator.

Bellator MMA
Charles made his promotional debut against Samoan kickboxing legend Mighty Mo at Bellator 100 on September 20, 2013. Charles was handed his first professional defeat via third-round TKO.

After his loss to Mighty Mo, Charles fought Dale Sopi on November 23, 2013 in a local Rage in the Cage event in Charles' home state of Arizona. Charles was defeated again via TKO, this time with a head kick and follow-up punches in just 12 seconds.

After the two consecutive losses, Charles faced British fighter Stuart Austin at Bellator 126 on September 26, 2014. Charles won via third-round knockout. He then defeated professional boxer James Wilson a month later at the Bellator MMA 2014 Monster Energy Cup via unanimous decision. 

Charles faced Bobby Lashley at Bellator 138 on June 19, 2015, replacing an injured James Thompson on short notice. He was defeated via second-round TKO.

Charles fought once more in the Bellator cage in 2015, defeating UFC veteran Chase Gormley via second-round KO. On May 20, 2016 Charles faced Brazilian Augusto Sakai at Bellator 155. The bout ended in a draw. Charles fought again on October 21, 2016 against former Strikeforce competitor Virgil Zwicker at Bellator 162. Charles, who came into the fight at his heaviest weight under the Bellator banner, was defeated via second-round TKO.

Independent promotions
Charles returned to competition on January 13, 2017 to face Mike Kyle for the ACB promotion. He was defeated via first-round TKO.

After a rematch with Dale Sopi fell through, Charles faced longtime veteran Tony Lopez for the RUF MMA Heavyweight Championship. Charles lost via first-round TKO. In a rematch again for the title two months later, Charles was able to defeat Lopez via knockout in the first round.

The two would meet for a third consecutive trilogy bout in 2018, with Lopez winning via a second-round submission to punches.

Personal life
Charles runs a sales company and has a daughter.

Mixed martial arts record

|-
|Loss
|align=center|11–7–1
| Tony Lopez
| TKO (submission to punches)
| Ringside Unified Fighting 24
| 
| align=center| 2
| align=center| 1:32
| Flagstaff, Arizona, United States
|Lost the RUF MMA Heavyweight Championship.
|-
|Win
| align=center| 11–6-1
| Tony Lopez
| KO (punches)
| Ringside Unified Fighting 22
| 
| align=center| 1
| align=center| 1:32
| Maricopa, Arizona, United States
| Won the RUF MMA Heavyweight Championship.
|-
|Loss
|align=center|10–6–1
| Tony Lopez
| TKO (punches)
| Ringside Unified Fighting 20
| 
| align=center| 1
| align=center| 2:50
| Flagstaff, Arizona, United States
|For the RUF MMA Heavyweight Championship.
|-
|Loss
|align=center|10–5–1
| Mike Kyle
| TKO (punches)
| |ACB 51: Silva vs. Torgeson
| 
| align=center| 1
| align=center| 2:15
| Irvine, California, United States
|
|-
|Loss
|align=center|10–4–1
|Virgil Zwicker
|TKO (knees and punches)
|Bellator 162
|
|align=center|2
|align=center|4:31
|Memphis, Tennessee, United States
|
|-
|Draw
|align=center|10–3–1
|Augusto Sakai
|Draw (majority)
|Bellator 155
|
|align=center|3
|align=center|5:00
|Boise, Idaho, United States
|
|-
|Win
|align=center|10–3
|Chase Gormley
|KO (punch)
|Bellator 143
|
|align=center|2
|align=center|4:35
|Hidalgo, Texas, United States
|
|-
| Loss
|align=center|9–3
|Bobby Lashley
|TKO (punches)
|Bellator 138
|
|align=center|2
|align=center|4:14
|St. Louis, Missouri, United States
|
|-
|Win
|align=center|9–2
|James Wilson
|Decision (unanimous)
|Bellator 2014 Monster Energy Cup
|
|align=center|3
|align=center|5:00
|Whitney, Nevada, United States
|
|-
| Win
| align=center|8–2
| Stuart Austin
| KO (punches)
| Bellator 126
| 
| align=center| 3
| align=center| 0:18
| Phoenix, Arizona, United States 
| 
|-
| Loss
| align=center|7–2
| Dale Sopi
| TKO (punches)
| Rage in the Cage 169
| 
| align=center| 1
| align=center| 0:12
| Chandler, Arizona, United States 
|For the RITC Heavyweight Championship.
|-
| Loss
| align=center|7–1
| Siala-Mou Siliga
| TKO (punches)
| Bellator 100
| 
| align=center| 3
| align=center| 1:26
| Phoenix, Arizona, United States 
| 
|-
| Win
| align=center|7–0
| Adam Smith
| TKO (punches)
| Rage in the Cage 166
| 
| align=center| 1
| align=center| 1:20
| Chandler, Arizona, United States 
| 
|-
| Win
| align=center| 6–0
| Maurice Greene
| Decision (unanimous)
| Flawless FC 3
| 
| align=center| 3
| align=center| 5:00
| Inglewood, California, United States
| 
|-
| Win
| align=center| 5–0
| Alex Moore
| TKO (retirement)
| Rage in the Cage 162
| 
| align=center| 1
| align=center| 5:00
| Chandler, Arizona, United States
| 
|-
| Win
| align=center| 4–0
| Kevin Absher
| KO (punch)
| Rage in the Cage 157
| 
| align=center| 1
| align=center| 0:13
| Chandler, Arizona, United States 
| 
|-
| Win
| align=center| 3–0
| John Maish
| Submission (guillotine choke)
| Rage in the Cage 156
| 
| align=center| 1
| align=center| 0:37
| Chandler, Arizona, United States 
| 
|-
| Win
| align=center| 2–0
| John Maish
| Submission (keylock)
| Rage in the Cage 154
| 
| align=center| 1
| align=center| 0:47
| Chandler, Arizona, United States 
| 
|-
| Win
| align=center| 1–0
| Nick Leitermann
| TKO (punches)
| Rage in the Cage 153
| 
| align=center| 1
| align=center| 1:26
| Chandler, Arizona, United States
|

References

Living people
1985 births
American male mixed martial artists
Heavyweight mixed martial artists
Mixed martial artists utilizing wrestling